The Taman Mutiara MRT station is an elevated rapid transit station in Cheras in south-eastern Kuala Lumpur, Malaysia. It is located above the Federal Route 1 Jalan Cheras, next to the Cheras Leisure Mall as well as EkoCheras Mall. And therefore, the station was thus provisionally named Leisure Mall station during construction.

The station is serving the neighbouring residential areas such as Taman Cheras Makmur (Taman Yulek), Taman Desa Aman, Taman Mutiara Barat, Taman Mutiara Timur, Taman Segar, Taman Taynton View and Taman Bukit Hijau.

The station is on the MRT Kajang Line and was opened on 17 July 2017, along with 19 stations under Phase 2 operations of the line.

Station Background

Station Layout 
The station has a layout and design similar to that of most other elevated stations on the line (except the terminus and underground stations), with the platform level on the topmost floor, consisting of two sheltered side platforms along a double tracked line and a single concourse housing ticketing facilities between the ground level and the platform level. All levels are linked by lifts, stairways and escalators.

Exits and entrances 
The station has three entrances (exclusive of linkways). The feeder buses operate from the station's feeder bus hub via Entrance B within the station area. There is a linkway which provides access to Leisure Mall and EkoCheras Mall each. Entrances B and C are located at the Leisure Mall side.

Bus Services

Feeder Bus Services 
With the opening of the MRT Kajang Line, feeder buses also began operating linking the station with several housing and commercial areas around Cheras Hartamas, Taman Segar, Persiaran Awana, Persiaran Lemak, Kampung Cheras Baru and Jalan Kuari area. The feeder buses operate from the station's feeder bus hub accessed via Entrance B of the station.

Other Bus Services 
The MRT Taman Mutiara station also provides accessibility for some other bus services.

Incidents
A woman was attacked and robbed by a man wearing a black t-shirt and jeans in one of the lifts at the station and the 56 seconds video of the incident caught by CCTV at the station went viral in social media.

Nearby
 UCSI University
 Cheras Plaza (Neway Karaoke & Tai Thong Restaurant)
 Cheras Leisure Mall
 EkoCheras Mall

Gallery

Station

Entrances and access

See also
 MRT Sungai Buloh-Kajang Line
 Cheras

References

External links
 Taman Mutiara MRT Station | mrt.com.my
 Klang Valley Mass Rapid Transit website

Rapid transit stations in Kuala Lumpur
Sungai Buloh-Kajang Line
Railway stations opened in 2017